Kalēti Parish is an administrative unit of South Kurzeme Municipality in the Courland region of Latvia. The parish has a population of 713 (as of 1/07/2013) and covers an area of 79.78 km2.

Villages of Kalēti parish 
 Kalēti
 Meiri
 Ozoli
 Upesmuiža

External links 
 Kalēti parish in Latvian

Parishes of Latvia
South Kurzeme Municipality
Courland